Judith, also referred to as Judith von Balingen or Judith von Friaul, was a Frankish noblewoman, the daughter of Eberhard of Friuli, Duke of Friuli, and Gisela, daughter of Louis the Pious.

Judith was a granddaughter of Louis the Pious and great-granddaughter of Charlemange. She was the mother of Gisela, and grandmother of Regelinda of Zürich, Duchess of Swabia. She received the town of Balingen by testament.

Other sources indicate that a Judith, daughter of Eberhard and Gisela, died in fact in 881 and married Conrad II, Duke of Transjurane Burgundy.

References

9th-century German women
9th-century births
9th-century deaths
838 births
863 deaths
Carolingian dynasty